Redland or Redlands may refer to:

Places

Australia 
Redland City, a local government area in South East Queensland
Electoral district of Redlands
SCECGS Redlands, an independent school in Cremorne, New South Wales

Canada 
Redland, Alberta
Redlands, Newfoundland and Labrador

Malaysia 
Redland, Kelantan (locally known as Tanah Merah), a territory and city/town in the state of Kelantan

United Kingdom 
Redland
Redland, Bristol, an inner suburb of Bristol
Redland railway station
Redland, Orkney, a hamlet on the Mainland, Orkney

Redlands

Redlands, Reading, a ward of Reading Borough Council
Redlands, West Wittering, West Sussex, country estate of Keith Richards, venue of the Redlands drugs bust
Redlands, Wiltshire, a hamlet in Highworth parish

United States 
Redland
Redland, Alabama, a census-designated place in Elmore County
Redland, Florida, a historic unincorporated community and agricultural area southwest of Miami
Redland, Maryland, a census-designated place northwest of Washington, D.C.
Redland, Oklahoma, an unincorporated community in Sequoyah County
Redland, Oregon, near Oregon City
Redland, Texas, in Angelina County
Redland, Virginia, in Albemarle County

Redlands
 Redlands, California, a city
 Redlands, Colorado, a city
 Redlands (Circleville, Ohio), listed on the National Register of Historic Places in Pickaway County, Ohio
 Redlands (Covesville, Virginia), listed on the National Register of Historic Places in Albemarle County, Virginia

Other uses 
Redland Football Club, Australian rules football club based in Redland City
Redland plc, British quarrying and brick making company owned by Lafarge Tarmac
Redland RDF Application Framework, an open-source software toolkit for the Resource Description Framework
The Redland, American hip-hop and R&B duo from Atlanta
Redlands Airfield, former grass-strip airfield near Swindon, England
University of Redlands, California, USA
In Ian Fleming's James Bond novels, "Redland" is sometimes used as a euphemism for the Soviet Union